Uliana Vyacheslavovna Donskova (born 24 August 1992) is a Russian group rhythmic gymnast. She is the 2012 Olympics Group All-around champion, the 2011 World Group All-around silver medalist, the 2010 World Group All-around bronze medalist, the 2012 European Group All-around gold medalist and the 2010 European Group All-around gold medalist.

Career

Donskova started training in gymnastics when she was five years old. She started competing with the Russian Group in 2007. They won gold medal in 10 Clubs Final at the 2007 European Championships in Baku. She competed in her first World Championship on August 12, 2009 in Japan, in Mie. There she together with the other Russian group received a gold medal and two bronze medals. She was again part of the Russian Group at the European Championships in Bremen and at the 2010 and 2011 World Championships.

She won the gold medal at the 2012 Summer Olympics in the group all-around event together with other group members (Ksenia Dudkina, Anastasia Bliznyuk, Alina Makarenko, Anastasia Nazarenko, Karolina Sevastyanova). Donskova admitted the group believed they would win gold in London "It was a long time with hard work. We believed in our victory, but we didn't allow ourselves to relax. We didn't think about the medal".

It was Russia's 4th consecutive win in the Group since the 2000 Summer Olympics. Donskova said: "We had no idea that we were going for four in a row." When asked to explain the secret of Russia's success in rhythmic gymnastics, she added: "We're born as rhythmic gymnasts." For six months leading up to the Olympic Games, the Russian gymnasts ate only buckwheat. Donskova retired from rhythmic gymnastics after the 2012 Olympics.

Personal life 
Donskova is a student at the Lesgaft National State University of Physical Culture, Sport & Health in Saint Petersburg, Russia. On June 25, 2014, Donskova married former CSKA Moskva Ice Hockey player Ruben Begunts. The couple had their first child in August 2015.

Detailed Olympic results

References

External links

 
 
 

1992 births
Living people
People from Kamensk-Shakhtinsky
Russian rhythmic gymnasts
Olympic gymnasts of Russia
Olympic gold medalists for Russia
Olympic medalists in gymnastics
Gymnasts at the 2012 Summer Olympics
Medalists at the 2012 Summer Olympics
Medalists at the Rhythmic Gymnastics World Championships
Medalists at the Rhythmic Gymnastics European Championships
Sportspeople from Rostov Oblast
21st-century Russian women